Faster Crashes Harder is the first album recorded by American pop-punk band Spitalfield, released in 2001. It was re-released in 2004 through Sinister Label/Walk in Cold Records.

Track listing
 "16:49 Army Time"
 "Off to the Shoulder"
 "Arbor Lane"
 "Wishing Well"
 "Track Five"
 "Line Jumper"
 "Don't Say I"
 "Plastic Stars"
 "First on a Long Left"
 "Sincerely, Empty"
 "Spiral Staircase"

Personnel
Adapted via Discogs.

Spitalfield
Mark Rose - vocals, guitar, piano
J.D. Romero - drums
Scott Morrow - vocals, guitar 
Terry Hahin - bass

Production
 Spitalfield - Producer, Engineer, Mixing
 Steve Versaw - Engineer 

Design and Artwork
 Eric Snyder, Spitalfield - Layout 
 Todd Carter - Mastering

References

Spitalfield albums
2001 debut albums
Victory Records albums